Air and Coastal Defense Command Football Club (Thai สโมสรฟุตบอลหน่วยบัญชาการต่อสู้อากาศยานและรักษาฝั่ง) or its abbreviated name is ACDC Football Club (Thai สโมสรฟุตบอล สอ.รฝ.), is a Thai professional football club under the stewardship of Air and Coastal Defense Command, Royal Thai Navy based in Sattahip, Chonburi, Thailand. The club is currently playing in the Thai League 3 Eastern region.

History
In 2018, the club was established.

In 2019, the club began to compete in the 2019 Thailand Amateur League Eastern region, using the Battleship stadium as the ground. At the end of the season, they have promoted to the 2020 Thai League 4.

In 2020, the club became a professional football club and competed in the Thai League 4. However, the Football Association of Thailand merged the Thai League 3 and Thai League 4. As a result of this incident, all teams in Thai League 4 were promoted to Thai League 3. The club competed in the Thai League 3 for the 2020–21 season. In late December 2020, the Coronavirus disease 2019 or also known as COVID-19 had spread again in Thailand, the FA Thailand must abruptly end the regional stage of the Thai League 3. The club has finished the ninth place of the Eastern region.

In 2021, the 2021–22 season is the second consecutive season in the Thai League 3 of ACDC. They started the season with a 1–4 away defeated to Pattaya Dolphins United and they ended the season with a 1–2 home defeated to the Pattaya Dolphins United. The club has finished seventh place in the league of the Eastern region. In addition, in the 2021–22 Thai League Cup ACDC was defeated 0–3 by Rajpracha in the qualification play-off round, causing them to be eliminated.

In 2022, the 2022–23 season is the third consecutive season in the Thai League 3 of ACDC.

Stadium and locations

Season by season record

P = Played
W = Games won
D = Games drawn
L = Games lost
F = Goals for
A = Goals against
Pts = Points
Pos = Final position

QR1 = First Qualifying Round
QR2 = Second Qualifying Round
R1 = Round 1
R2 = Round 2
R3 = Round 3
R4 = Round 4

R5 = Round 5
R6 = Round 6
QF = Quarter-finals
SF = Semi-finals
RU = Runners-up
W = Winners

Players

Current squad

References

External links
 Thai League official website

Association football clubs established in 2018
Football clubs in Thailand
Chonburi province
2018 establishments in Thailand